Rybkhoz Vorsha is a rural locality (a village) in Kurilovskoye Rural Settlement, Sobinsky District, Vladimir Oblast, Russia. The population was 52 as of 2010.

Geography 
Rybkhoz Vorsha is located on the Vorsha River, 10 km northeast of Sobinka (the district's administrative centre) by road. Konino is the nearest rural locality.

References 

Rural localities in Sobinsky District